Simocyon ("short-snouted dog") is a genus of extinct carnivoran mammal in the family Ailuridae.  Simocyon, which was about the size of a mountain lion, lived in the late Miocene and early Pliocene epochs, and has been found in Europe, Asia, and rarely, North America (Peigné et al., 2005) and Africa.

Classification
 
The relationship of Simocyon to other carnivores has been controversial, but studies of the structure of its ear, teeth, and ankle now indicate that its closest living relative is the red panda, Ailurus (Wang, 1997; Peigné et al., 2005), although it is different enough to be classified in a separate subfamily (Simocyoninae) along with related genera Alopecocyon and Actiocyon.  While the red panda is primarily herbivorous, the teeth and skull of Simocyon indicate that it was carnivorous, and it may have engaged in some bone-crushing, like living hyenas (Peigné et al., 2005).  The skeleton of Simocyon indicates that, like the red panda, it could climb trees, although it probably also spent considerable time on the ground (Salesa et al., 2008).  Simocyon and Ailurus both have a radial sesamoid, an unusual bone in the wrist that acts as a false thumb (Salesa et al., 2006). Its competitors during its time period were tremarctine bears, nimravid false cats, and early canids and felids.

References

Bibliography
 Peigné, S., M. Salesa, M. Antón, and J. Morales. (2005). "Ailurid carnivoran mammal Simocyon from the late Miocene of Spain and the systematics of the genus." Acta Palaeontologica Polonica. Vol. 50:219-238.
 Salesa, M. J., Antón, M., Peigné, S., and J. Morales. (2008). "Functional anatomy and biomechanics of the postcranial skeleton of Simocyon batalleri (Viret, 1929) (Carnivora, Ailuridae) from the late Miocene of Spain". Zoological Journal of the Linnean Society, vol. 152: 593–621.
 Salesa, M., M. Antón, S. Peigné, and J. Morales. (2006). "Evidence of a false thumb in a fossil carnivore clarifies the evolution of pandas." Proceedings of the National Academy of Sciences. Vol. 103:379-382.
 Wang, X. (1997). "New cranial material of Simocyon from China, and its implications for phylogenetic relationships to the red panda (Ailurus)." Journal of Vertebrate Paleontology. Vol. 17:184-198.

Miocene carnivorans
Pliocene carnivorans
Neogene mammals of Africa
Neogene mammals of Asia
Neogene mammals of Europe
Neogene mammals of North America
Prehistoric carnivoran genera
Ailuridae
Miocene genus first appearances
Zanclean extinctions
Taxa named by Johann Andreas Wagner
Fossil taxa described in 1858